Steven Ray Busick (born December 10, 1958) is a former American football linebacker in the National Football League. He was drafted by the Denver Broncos in the seventh round of the 1981 NFL Draft. He graduated from Temple City High School in 1977, then played college football at USC.

Busick also played for the Los Angeles Rams and San Diego Chargers.

References

1958 births
Living people
American football linebackers
USC Trojans football players
Denver Broncos players
Los Angeles Rams players
San Diego Chargers players